The 1994 Kazakhstan Cup Final was the third final of the Kazakhstan Cup. The match was contested by Vostok and Aktyubinets at Central Stadium in Almaty. The match was played on 7 November 1994 and was the final match of the competition.

Background
Vostok and Aktyubinets played the first Kazakhstan Cup Final.

Vostok and Aktyubinets played twice during the league season. In both matches Aktyubinets won. On June 27, 1994 Aktyubinets won the first match with the score 3-0 at the Central Stadium. Goals were scored by Dmitri Ogay, Ivan Kabakhidze and Andrei Miroshnichenko. On August 21, 1994 Aktyubinets won as visitors with the score 1-3. Goals were scored by Igor Kister, Dmitri Yurist, Andrei Miroshnichenko (all Aktyubinets) and Ruslan Duzmambetov (Vostok).

Route to the Final

Vostok

Aktyubinets

Match

Details

References

1994 domestic association football cups
1994 in Kazakhstani football
Kazakhstan Cup Finals
Kazakhstan Cup Final 1994